Leo Walta (born 24 June 2003) is a Finnish professional footballer who plays as a midfielder for HB Køge, on loan from Danish Superliga club FC Nordsjælland.

Club career

HJK Helsinki
Walta started at HJK Helsinki when he was eight years old. Walta was a very attractive player during his youth years at HJK, where it led to several trials in, among others, German clubs TSG 1899 Hoffenheim and Bayern Munich, and also at Dutch club PSV Eindhoven. However, he couldn't move abroad until he was 16 years old, according to FIFA rules.

Therefore, he stayed at HJK and at the age of 15 in May 2019, started playing for HJK's reserve team, Klubi 04, in the Finnish third division, Kakkonen.

FC Nordsjælland
In September 2019 it announced, that FC Nordsjælland had bought 16-year old Walta from HJK Helsinki for "a significant transfer amount". In his first season at the club, he mostly played for the U-17 team, but also made seven appearances and scored two goals for the U-19s, while he also made his reserve team debut in November 2019.

In the 2020-21 season, Walta became a key player for Nordsjælland's U19s, where he played 23 league games and scored six goals. At the end of the season, on 14 July 2021, Nordsjælland confirmed, that Walta had signed a new deal with the club and had been promoted to the first team squad. Four days later, on 18 July 2021, Walta got his professional debut for Nordsjælland against Viborg FF in the Danish Superliga.

On transfer deadline day, 31 January 2023, HB Køge confirmed that Walta had joined the club on a loan deal for the remainder of the season.

References

External links
 

2003 births
Living people
Finnish footballers
Finnish expatriate footballers
Association football midfielders
Finland youth international footballers
Finland under-21 international footballers
Kakkonen players
Danish Superliga players
Helsingin Jalkapalloklubi players
Klubi 04 players
FC Nordsjælland players
HB Køge players
People from Vantaa
Finnish expatriate sportspeople in Denmark
Expatriate men's footballers in Denmark